Tylognathus is an invalid genus of ray-finned fishes in the family Cyprinidae. It was established by Heckel in 1843 without a type species. Varicorhinus diplostomus, described by Heckel in 1838 and erroneously redescribed by the same author in 1844 as T. valenciennesii, was later designated the type species. Today this fish is placed in the genus Bangana.

The members of this polyphyletic assemblage mainly belong to the group which is known as the subfamily Labeoninae to some authors and the tribe Labeonini of subfamily Cyprininae by others.

The taxa formerly placed in Tylognathus are:

 Tylognathus ariza (Hamilton, 1807) is now Bangana ariza
 Tylognathus barbatulus Heckel, 1844 is now Crossocheilus diplochilus
 Tylognathus bo Popta, 1904	is now Lobocheilos bo
 Tylognathus boides Popta, 1906 is now Lobocheilos bo
 Tylognathus brunneus Fowler, 1934 is now Henicorhynchus siamensis
 Tylognathus cantini Sauvage, 1882 is now Labeo cylindricus
 Tylognathus caudimaculatus Fowler, 1934 is now Cirrhinus caudimaculatus
 Tylognathus coatesi Fowler, 1937 is now Crossocheilus reticulatus
 Tylognathus davidi Sauvage, 1878 is now Sarcocheilichthys davidi
 Tylognathus davisi Fowler, 1937 is now Lobocheilos davisi
 Tylognathus delacouri Pellegrin & Fang, 1940 is now Lobocheilos delacouri
 Tylognathus elegans Günther, 1868 is now Hemigrammocapoeta elegans
 Tylognathus falcifer (Valenciennes, 1842) is now Lobocheilos falcifer
 Tylognathus festai (Tortonese, 1939) is now Garra festai
 Tylognathus fowleri Pellegrin & Chevey, 1936 is now Lobocheilos fowleri
 Tylognathus gedrosicus (Zugmayer, 1912) is now Labeo gedrosicus
 Tylognathus gracilis Fowler, 1937 is now Lobocheilos gracilis
 Tylognathus heterorhynchus (Bleeker, 1853) is now Schismatorhynchos heterorhynchos
 Tylognathus hispidus (Valenciennes, 1842) is now Lobocheilos falcifer
 Tylognathus kajanensis Popta, 1904 is now Lobocheilos kajanensis
 Tylognathus klatti is now Crossocheilus klatti or part of Hemigrammocapoeta
 Tylognathus lehat (Bleeker, 1858) is now Lobocheilos lehat
 Tylognathus melanotaenia Fowler, 1935 is now Lobocheilos melanotaenia
 Tylognathus montanus Günther, 1889 is now Labeo cylindricus
 Tylognathus nanus is now Hemigrammocapoeta nana
 Tylognathus porcellus Heckel, 1844 is now Labeo porcellus
 Tylognathus quadrilineatus Fowler, 1935 is now Lobocheilos quadrilineatus
 Tylognathus rhabdoura Fowler, 1934 is now Lobocheilos rhabdoura
 Tylognathus schwanenfeldii (Bleeker, 1853) is now Lobocheilos schwanenfeldii
 Tylognathus siamensis de Beaufort, 1927 is now Henicorhynchus siamensis
 Tylognathus sinensis Kner, 1867 is now Abbottina rivularis
 Tylognathus steinitziorum is now Hemigrammocapoeta nana
 Tylognathus striolatus Günther, 1868 is now Labeo boggut
 Tylognathus trangensis Fowler, 1939 is now Lobocheilos trangensis
 Tylognathus valenciennesii Heckel, 1844 is now Bangana diplostoma

References 

Obsolete vertebrate taxa
Cyprinidae genera
Labeoninae
Taxonomy articles created by Polbot